Yarnold is a surname. Notable people with the surname include:

David Yarnold (born 1952), American conservationist
Edward Yarnold (1926–2002), English Jesuit
Hugo Yarnold (1917–1974), English cricketer
Lizzy Yarnold (born 1988), British skeleton racer
Rob Yarnold, British radio director
Stephen Edwin Yarnold (1903–1978), Australian army chaplain
Walter Yarnold (1893–1978), English cricketer